Sandra Paović (born 15 April 1983) is a former Croatian para table tennis player. Sandra suffered critical injuries in a traffic accident on 30 January 2009. , she was still undergoing therapy in the effort to regain full use of her legs.

Sporting career
She first competed internationally at the 2008 Summer Olympics, reaching the second round of the singles competition. She also competed in the team competition.

She competed in para table tennis competitions in 2013 at the Lignano Master Open, she won her class 6 singles title four times. She competed at the 2016 Summer Paralympics, her first Paralympic Games where she won the gold medal after defeating Stephanie Grebe of Germany.

References

2008 Olympic profile

External links
 Prvi koraci u domovini 

1983 births
Living people
Croatian female table tennis players
Table tennis players at the 2008 Summer Olympics
Olympic table tennis players of Croatia
Sportspeople from Vukovar
Medalists at the 2016 Summer Paralympics
Table tennis players at the 2016 Summer Paralympics
Paralympic medalists in table tennis
Paralympic gold medalists for Croatia